John William Thorns (10 July 1928 – 1975) was an English amateur footballer who played as an outside right in the Football League for Darlington. He appeared only once for the club, in April 1950 in a 2–0 defeat at home to Accrington Stanley in the Third Division North.

References

1928 births
1975 deaths
Footballers from Newcastle upon Tyne
English footballers
Association football outside forwards
Darlington F.C. players
English Football League players